Seke might be:
The Seki language of Equatorial Guinea and Gabon
The Thakali language of Nepal
The Ske language of Pentecost Island, Vanuatu